Omphalotrix is a monotypic genus of flowering plants belonging to the family Orobanchaceae. The only species is Omphalotrix longipes.

Its native range is Southern Siberia to Russian Far East and Northern China.

References

Orobanchaceae
Orobanchaceae genera
Monotypic Lamiales genera